Teufelsbach may refer to the following rivers in Germany:

 Teufelsbach (Rhynerscher Bach) of North Rhine-Westphalia, a tributary of the Rhynerscher Bach
 Teufelsbach (Müggenbach) of North Rhine-Westphalia, a tributary of the Müggenbach which is itself a tributary of the Morsbach
 Teufelsbach (Alaunbach) of North Rhine-Westphalia in the Beuel district of Bonn
 Teufelsbach (Goldbach) of Saxony-Anhalt in the county of Harz

See also
 Teufelsgrundbach, a tributary of the River Selke in the Lower Harz in Saxony-Anhalt